Nivala (formerly known as Pidisjärvi) is a town and municipality of Finland. It is located in the Northern Ostrobothnia region. The town has a population of 
which 
is water. The population density is
. The municipality is unilingually Finnish.

The subject of Nivala's coat of arms describes the wooden gate model typical of the municipality, and at the same time the shape of the gate resembles the initial letter of the name of the municipality. The coat of arms was designed by Kalervo Kallio, the son of president Kyösti Kallio, and the Nivala municipal council approved it at its meeting on 23 November 1964. The Ministry of the Interior approved the coat of arms for use on 4 February 1965.

Geography 
Neighbouring municipalities are Haapajärvi, Haapavesi, Sievi, and Ylivieska.

Nature
The Kalajoki river flows through the municipality. The biggest lake in the region is Pidisjärvi and the two other lakes are Suojärvi and Erkkisjärvi.

Notable people
Kyösti Kallio, the fourth President of Finland (1937–1940), was a resident of Nivala.
Rakel Liehu, writer
Maria Lohela, former Speaker of the Parliament of Finland (2015–2018)
Atte Ohtamaa, hockey player

References

External links

Municipality of Nivala – Official website

Cities and towns in Finland
Municipalities of North Ostrobothnia
Populated places established in 1867